The Commonwealth Security Service (CSS)  was an arm of the earlier forms of the Commonwealth Police of Australia.

It operated in the 1930s and 1940s, and was amalgamated with the Commonwealth Investigation Branch, to form the Commonwealth Investigation Service (CIS) in 1946. 
It was involved in monitoring events and organisations considered problematic by the government of the time, including strikes 1948 Queensland railway strike

References

See also
 Commonwealth Police

Defunct law enforcement agencies of Australia
Defunct Commonwealth Government agencies of Australia